Powder Blue may refer to:

 Powder blue, a shade of blue
 Powder Blue (film), written and directed by Timothy Linh Bui
 "Powder Blue", by Ween from 12 Golden Country Greats, 1996
 "Powder Blue", by Elbow from Asleep in the Back, 2001
 "Powder Blue", by Ty Dolla Sign featuring Gunna from Featuring Ty Dolla Sign, 2020
 Powder Blues, a 1983 album by the Powder Blues Band